Arthur Sissis (born 15 June 1995) is an Australian motorcycle and speedway rider and former Grand Prix motorcycle racer who last rode for Mahindra Racing in the Moto3 World Championship before being replaced by Andrea Migno mid season due to racing position's. He currently competes in the Australian Superbike Championship, aboard a Yamaha YZF-R1 2021.

Career

Junior speedway
Sissis started racing junior motocross before joining the Sidewinders Under 16 Speedway Club in the northern suburbs of Adelaide at just 9 years of age. He went on to win the 2008 and 2009, 2011 Australian Under-16 Individual Speedway Championships, and finished second to Brady Kurtz from New South Wales, in the final of the 2010 championship.

Red Bull MotoGP Rookie Cup
Sissis then chased his Grand Prix dream and went on to ride in the 2010 Red Bull MotoGP Rookie Cup. A best placing of 6th in the first race of Round 3 at Assen saw him finish 13th in the championship. He again rode in the championship in 2011, scoring three wins (Jerez race 2, Assen race 2 and Mugello race 1) and finished 2nd in the championship, only 9 points behind Italian Lorenzo Baldassarri.

It was during 2011 that Sissis got his first Grand Prix start when he rode an Aprilia 125cc at the Malaysian Grand Prix. After qualifying 30th he had a steady race and finished in 20th.

Moto3 World Championship
In 2012, Sissis has joined the Red Bull KTM Ajo team for the Moto3 World Championship, replacing the 125cc World Championship. After qualifying 9th for the first race at the Losail International Circuit in Qatar, Sissis got a good start and was 2nd on the first lap before slowly dropping back and eventually finishing 7th.

The high point in Sissis' racing career to date was his third-place finish at his home Grand Prix at Phillip Island on 28 October 2012. Sissis led home a competitive pack behind the two leaders, his position only secured in the final seconds of the race, by only 0.054 seconds from fourth placed Alex Rins. This result was his only Grand Prix podium.

Return to speedway
In December 2014, Sissis decided on a return to speedway, signing to ride in 2015 for Sheffield Tigers in the British Premier League.

In his return to speedway, Sissis finished 10th in the 2014/15 South Australian Solo Championship held at the Gillman Speedway in Adelaide on 28 December 2014.

In May 2016 he rejoined the Sheffield Tigers team.

Career statistics

Red Bull MotoGP Rookies Cup

Races by year
(key) (Races in bold indicate pole position, races in italics indicate fastest lap)

Grand Prix motorcycle racing

By season

Races by year
(key) (Races in bold indicate pole position; races in italics indicate fastest lap)

References

External links

1995 births
Living people
Australian motorcycle racers
Australian people of Greek descent
125cc World Championship riders
Moto3 World Championship riders
Australian speedway riders